Dr. Samuel Harrell House, also known as the Harrell House, is a historic home located at Noblesville, Hamilton County, Indiana.  It was built in 1898, and is a large -story, Queen Anne style frame dwelling.  It features irregular massing; a three-story, polygonal corner tower; multi gable-on-hip roof; and wraparound porch.  Also on the property is a contributing two-story, frame carriage house.

It was listed on the National Register of Historic Places in 1984.  It is located in the Catherine Street Historic District.

References

Houses on the National Register of Historic Places in Indiana
Queen Anne architecture in Indiana
Houses completed in 1898
Buildings and structures in Hamilton County, Indiana
National Register of Historic Places in Hamilton County, Indiana
Historic district contributing properties in Indiana